Viviana Velásquez (born 1 December 1991) is a Colombian former professional racing cyclist. She won the Colombian National Road Race Championships in 2010 and 2011.

References

External links
 

1991 births
Living people
Colombian female cyclists
Place of birth missing (living people)
20th-century Colombian women
21st-century Colombian women